Pierre Guichot (born 16 February 1963) is a French former fencer. He won a silver medal in the team sabre at the 1984 Summer Olympics and a bronze in the same event at the 1992 Summer Olympics.

References

External links
 

1963 births
Living people
French male sabre fencers
Olympic fencers of France
Fencers at the 1984 Summer Olympics
Fencers at the 1988 Summer Olympics
Fencers at the 1992 Summer Olympics
Olympic silver medalists for France
Olympic bronze medalists for France
Olympic medalists in fencing
Sportspeople from Hautes-Pyrénées
Medalists at the 1984 Summer Olympics
Medalists at the 1992 Summer Olympics
20th-century French people